Birds described in 1885 include semicollared flycatcher, Palawan hornbill, blue bird-of-paradise, lesser lophorina, brown sicklebill, Comoros cuckooshrike, Cozumel vireo, Indochinese green magpie, three-streaked tchagra, Lawes's parotia, Turquoise-winged parrotlet

Events
Death of Samuel Cabot III, Nikolai Severtzov
William Brewster becomes curator of mammals and birds at the Museum of Comparative Zoology. 
John Whitehead begins exploring in Malacca, North Borneo, Java, and Palawan. 
Ornis; internationale Zeitschrift für die gesammte Ornithologie.Vienna 1885-1905 online BHL commences.

Publications
Bradford Torrey Birds in the Bush 
Otto Finsch and Adolf Bernhard Meyer, 1885. Vögel von Neu Guinea, zumeist aus der Alpen-region am südostabhange des Owen-Stanley-Gebirges (Hufeisengebirge 7000-8000' hoch), gesammelt von Karl Hunstein. I. Paradiseidae. Zeitschrift für die gesammte Ornithologie 2: 369–391. online
Leonhard Stejneger ,1885. Results of ornithological explorations in the Commander Islands and in Kamtschatka. Bulletin of the United States National Museum. 1–382, 8 figs, 8 pls. online
Robert Ridgway Description of some new species of birds from Cozumel Island, Yucatán Proceedings of the Biological Society of Washington 1885 3: 2–24.online
Osbert Salvin A List of the Birds obtained by Mr. Henry Whitely in British Guiana.Ibis 1885 3 (5) :291-306 online
Richard Bowdler Sharpe A Monograph of the Hirundinidae. (2 volumes). (with Claude Wilmot Wyatt). London: Printed for the authors. 1885–1894. (Vol. 1, Vol. 2) online BHL
Ongoing events
Osbert Salvin and Frederick DuCane Godman 1879–1904. Biologia Centrali-Americana . Aves
Richard Bowdler Sharpe Catalogue of the Birds in the British Museum London,1874-98.
Cabanis, Anton Reichenow, Hans von Berlepsch, and other members of the German Ornithologists' Society in Journal für Ornithologie online BHL
The Auk online BHL
The Ibis

References

Bird
Birding and ornithology by year